Shamilsky District is an administrative and municipal district (raion), one of the forty-one in the Republic of Dagestan, Russia. It is located in the western central part of the republic. Its administrative center is the rural locality (a selo) of Khebda. As of the 2010 Census, the total population of the district was 28,122, with the population of Khebda accounting for 9.1% of that number.

History
Until 1994, the district was called Sovetsky.

Administrative and municipal status
Within the framework of administrative divisions, Shamilsky District is one of the forty-one in the Republic of Dagestan. The district is divided into ten selsoviets which comprise fifty-two rural localities. As a municipal division, the district is incorporated as Shamilsky Municipal District. Its ten selsoviets are incorporated as twenty-five rural settlements within the municipal district. The selo of Khebda serves as the administrative center of both the administrative and municipal district.

References

Notes

Sources

Districts of Dagestan